Yiliang Ding is a plant scientist at the John Innes Centre.

Since 2014 she has been a group leader, with a David Philips Fellowship. Ding researches RNA structure and post-transcriptional gene regulations. Ding’s research on nucleic acid chemistry and RNA biology focuses on understanding the dynamics of RNA structure in living cells. Her experimental approach to this means that she develops new approaches for revealing in vivo structurome. In particular her work on a high throughput method, Structure-seq to analyse one of the first two genome-wide in vivo RNA structure maps, this work was published in Nature in 2013. This paper "In vivo genome-wide profiling of RNA secondary structure reveals novel regulatory features" has been widely cited as a method for in vivo RNA structural analysis. This paper has been cited 489 times according to Google Scholar.

Prior to her move to the John Innes Centre as a group leader, Ding worked as a Postdoctoral Scholar at Penn State University, where she worked on the structural folding of RNA/DNA under the Human Frontier Science Program Grant.

Ding spent two months in the lab of David Lilley at the University of Dundee between November and December 2009.

She studied for her PhD at the John Innes Centre under the supervision of Professor Giles Oldroyd between October 2005 and November 2009. She was a John Innes Foundation Rotation Programme student, with Marie Curie Fellowships - Early stage research training (EST)  and chose to study the regulation of Legume nodulation, receiving her PhD from the University of East Anglia in 2009.

Ding established how abscisic acid, a plant hormone, coordinates the regulation of nodulation. This work was published in Plant Cell in 2008.  This paper has been cited 171 times according to Google Scholar.

She has recently shown the first evidence of RNA structure-driven phase separation.

Prior to this Ding studied at the Shanghai Jiao Tong University and received a BSc in Plant Science.

References 

Year of birth missing (living people)
Living people
Chinese women biologists